The Blue Kitten was a 1922 Broadway musical with a book and lyrics by Otto Harbach and William Carey Duncan and music by Rudolf Friml. It premiered at the Selwyn Theatre on January 13 1922 and ran until May 13, 1922, totaling 140 performances.

The show was a "modest musical hit", although some critics called its score "inferior".

Synopsis 
A headwaiter pretends to be upper-class so his daughter can marry a socialite.

Cast

Songs 

 A 12 O'Clock Girl in a 9 O'Clock Town
 The Blue Kitten Blues
 Cutie

References 

1922 musicals
Broadway musicals